Thomasville City Schools is a public school district in Thomasville, Georgia, United States, based in Thomasville. It serves the city of Thomasville

Schools
The Thomasville City Schools has three elementary schools, one middle school, and one high school.

Elementary schools
 Jerger Elementary School (PreK - 5)
 Harper Elementary School (PreK -5)
 Scott Elementary School (PreK - 5)

Middle school
MacIntyre Park Middle School (6-8)

High school
Thomasville High School (9-12)

References

External links

School districts in Georgia (U.S. state)
Education in Thomas County, Georgia